The Mandate of Heaven is a Chinese political philosophy that was used in ancient and imperial China to legitimize the rule of the King or Emperor of China. According to this doctrine, heaven (天, Tian) – which embodies the natural order and will of the universe – bestows the mandate on a just ruler of China, the "Son of Heaven". If a ruler was overthrown, this was interpreted as an indication that the ruler was unworthy and had lost the mandate. It was also a common belief that natural disasters such as famine and flood were divine retributions bearing signs of Heaven's displeasure with the ruler, so there would often be revolts following major disasters as the people saw these calamities as signs that the Mandate of Heaven had been withdrawn.

The Mandate of Heaven does not require a legitimate ruler to be of noble birth, depending instead on how well that person can rule. Chinese dynasties such as the Han and Ming were founded by men of common origins, but they were seen as having succeeded because they had gained the Mandate of Heaven. Retaining the mandate is contingent on the just and able performance of the rulers and their heirs.

Intrinsic to the concept of the Mandate of Heaven was the right of rebellion against an unjust ruler. The Mandate of Heaven was often invoked by philosophers and scholars in China as a way to curtail the abuse of power by the ruler, in a system that had few other checks. Chinese historians interpreted a successful revolt as evidence that Heaven had withdrawn its mandate from the ruler. Throughout Chinese history, times of poverty and natural disasters were often taken as signs that heaven considered the incumbent ruler unjust and thus in need of replacement.

The concept of the Mandate of Heaven also extends to the ruler's family having divine rights and was first used to support the rule of the kings of the Zhou dynasty (1046–256 BC) to legitimize their overthrow of the earlier Shang dynasty (1600–1069 BC). It was used throughout the history of China to legitimize the successful overthrow and installation of new emperors, including by non-Han Chinese dynasties such as the Qing (1636–1912).

History

Transition between the Shang and the Zhou 
The prosperous Shang dynasty saw its rule filled with multiple outstanding accomplishments. Notably, the dynasty lasted for a considerable time during which 31 kings ruled over an extended period of 17 generations. During this period, the dynasty enjoyed a period of peace and tranquility in which citizens could make a good living. The government was originally able to control most of its internal affairs due to the firm support provided by the people. As time went on, however, the rulers' abuse of the other social classes led to social unrest and instability. The corruption in this dynasty created the conditions necessary for a new ruling house to risethe Zhou dynasty. Rebellion against the Shang was led by Zhou Wu. They were the first to use the concept of the Mandate of Heaven to explain their right to assume rule and presumed that the only way to hold the mandate was to rule well in the eyes of Heaven. They also stated that the Shang came into power because the Xia had lost their mandate. The mandate had then been bestowed upon the Shang, leading to the fall of the Xia and the rise of the Shang. They believed that the Shang ruling house had become morally corrupt and that the Shang leaders' loss of virtue entitled their own house to take over. The overthrow of the Shang Dynasty, they said, was in accordance with the mandate given by Heaven.

After the Zhou became the ruling dynasty, they mostly appointed their own officials. The Zhou Dynasty had its own way of assigning its officials. However, in order to appease some of the citizens, they allowed some Shang beneficiaries to continue governing their small kingdoms in compliance with Zhou rules and regulations.  As the empire continued to expand, intermarriage increased because the rulers believed that it was a method of forming strong alliances that enabled them to absorb more countries into the dynasty. In the case of a war, the Zhou dynasty boasted excellent military and technology mostly because of influence from annexed countries. They also excelled in shipbuilding, which, coupled with their discovery of celestial navigation, made them excellent mariners. Intellectually, the Zhou excelled in fields of literature and philosophy while many governmental positions were filled according to the intellectual ability of a candidate. A large amount of literature survives from the Zhou period, including the Book of Changes, Book of History, Book of Etiquette, Book of Song, Book of Odes, and the Book of Rites. Most of these works are commentaries on the progress and political movement of the dynasty. In philosophical terms, Confucius and his followers played an important role in shaping the mentality of the government as defined by the Five Confucian Relationships. These critical thinkers served as a foundation for the government. Their works primarily stressed the importance of the ruling class, respect, and their relationship with the lower class. Due to the growing size of the dynasty, it became apparent that a centralized government would lead to a lot of confusion and corruption because the government would not be able to exert its influence or accede to the needs of everyone. To address this political barrier, the dynasty formed a decentralized government in which the empire was broken down into sections, called the Fengjian System. Within these districts were administrators who were appointed by the government, in return, they had to maintain their allegiance to the main internal government. In effect, the Zhou dynasty became a collection of districts. Consequently, this marked the fall of the dynasty as it became difficult for the central government to exert influence on all other regions of the empire.

Finally, when the Zhou dynasty's power decreased, it was wiped out by the State of Qin, which believed that the Zhou had become weak and their rule unjust. This transition emphasizes the customary trend of the Mandate of Heaven, which provided leeway for the rise of a new power. The Qin initially attempted to capitalize on the errors made by the Zhou, either by eliminating the source of error or reforming it. During this reformation, administrative changes were made and a system of legalism was developed which stated that the law is supreme over every individual, including the rulers. Although significant progress was made during the Qin dynasty, the persecution of scholars and ordinary citizens led to an unstable state.

After the death of Qin Shihuang, the first emperor of the Qin dynasty, a widespread revolt by prisoners, peasants, and unhappy soldiers inevitably led to the fall of the Qin dynasty due to its tyrannical practices. The establishment of the Han dynasty marked a great period in China's history marked by significant changes in the political structure of the country. Under the Han emperors, significant changes were made in which the government introduced entrance examinations known as civil service or imperial examinations for governmental positions. Additionally, the Han dynasty prospered economically through the Silk Road and other trading means.

Five Dynasties period 

During the Five Dynasties and Ten Kingdoms Period, there was no dominant Chinese dynasty that ruled all of China. This created a problem for the Song dynasty that followed, as they wanted to legitimize their rule by establishing a clear transmission of the Mandate from the Tang through to the Song. The scholar-official Xue Juzheng compiled the Old History of the Five Dynasties (五代史) during the 960s and 970s, after the Song dynasty had taken northern China from the last of the Five Dynasties, the Later Zhou. A major purpose of the book was to establish justification for the transference of the Mandate of Heaven through these five dynasties and thus to the Song dynasty. He argued that these dynasties met certain vital criteria to be considered as having attained the Mandate of Heaven despite never having ruled all of China. One is that they all ruled the traditional Chinese heartland.

However, there were certain other areas where these dynasties all clearly fell short. The brutal behavior of Zhu Wen and his Later Liang was a source of considerable embarrassment, and thus there was pressure to exclude them from the Mandate. The following three dynasties, the Later Tang, Later Jin, and Later Han were all non-Han Chinese dynasties with rulers from the Shatuo ethnic minority. Additionally, none of them were able to defeat the powerful states to the south and unify the entire Chinese realm. However, Xue Juzheng concluded that the Mandate had indeed passed through each of the Five Dynasties, and thus onto the Song Dynasty when it conquered the last of those dynasties.

Qing invasion 

The Qing claimed that the peasant rebel Li Zicheng had overthrown the Ming, and so the Qing were not responsible for the destruction of the Ming dynasty. Instead, the Qing argued, they had obtained the Mandate of Heaven by defeating the many rebels and bandits that the Ming had failed to control and restoring stability to the empire.
Just as stability was a sign of Heaven's favor, difficulties were a sign of Heaven's displeasure. Thus, emperors in the Qing and earlier dynasties often interpreted natural disasters during their reigns as reasons to reflect on their failures to act and govern correctly.

The right to rule and the right of rebellion 
Mencius stated that:

Chinese historians interpreted a successful revolt as evidence that the Mandate of Heaven had passed. In China, the right of rebellion against an unjust ruler has been a part of political philosophy ever since the Zhou dynasty, and the successful rebellion was interpreted by Chinese historians as evidence that divine approval had passed on to the successive dynasty. The Right of Rebellion is not coded into any official law. Rather, rebellion is always outlawed and severely punished; but is still a positive right grounded in the Chinese moral system. Often, it is used as a justification for actions to overthrow a previous dynasty after a rebellion has been successful and a new dynastic rule has been established. Since the winner is the one who determines who has obtained the Mandate of Heaven and who has lost it, some Chinese scholars consider it to be a sort of victor's justice, best characterized in the popular Chinese saying "The winner becomes king, the loser becomes outlaw" (Chinese: “成者爲王，敗者爲寇”). Due to this, it is considered that Chinese historical accounts of the fall of a dynasty and the rise of a new one must be handled with caution. Chinese traditional historical compilation methods produce accounts that tend to fit their account to the theory, emphasizing aspects tending to prove that the old dynasty lost the Mandate of Heaven and the new one gained it, and de-emphasizing other aspects.

In the 20th and 21st centuries, Confucianist elements of student rebellions often claimed the Mandate of Heaven has been forfeited, as demonstrated by their large-scale activism, with notable instances including the 2014 Sunflower Student Movement in Taiwan and the 2014 Hong Kong protests.

Influence
Because of China's influence in medieval times, the concept of the Mandate of Heaven spread to other East Asian countries as a justification for rule by divine political legitimacy. In Korea, the kingdom of Goguryeo, one of the Three Kingdoms of Korea, adopted the Chinese concept of tianxia which was based on Mandate of Heaven, however in Goguryeo it was changed to be based on divine ancestry. The kingdom of Silla is also said to be adopted the Mandate of Heaven, but the earliest records are from Joseon Dynasty, which made the Mandate of Heaven an enduring state ideology.

The ideology was also adopted in Vietnam, known in Vietnamese as Thiên mệnh (Chữ Hán: 天命).  A divine mandate gave the Vietnamese emperor the right to rule, based not on his lineage but on his competence to govern. The later and more centralized Vietnamese dynasties adopted Confucianism as the state ideology, which led to the creation of a Vietnamese tributary system in Southeast Asia that was modeled after the Chinese Sinocentric system in East Asia.

In Japan, the Japanese government found the concept ideologically problematic, preferring not to have divine political legitimacy that was conditional and that could be withdrawn. The Japanese Taihō Code, formulated in 703, was largely an adaptation of the governmental system of the Tang dynasty, but the Mandate of Heaven was specifically omitted.

See also 
 Interactions Between Heaven and Mankind
 Monarchy of China
 East Asian cultural sphere

References

Sources 

 
 .
 
 

Chinese philosophy
Monarchy
Political history of China
Theories of history
Relationship between Heaven and Mankind